The 2013–14 North Carolina Central Eagles men's basketball team represented North Carolina Central University during the 2013–14 NCAA Division I men's basketball season. The Eagles, led by fifth year head coach LeVelle Moton, played their home games at the McLendon–McDougald Gymnasium and were members of the Mid-Eastern Athletic Conference. They finished the season 28–6, 15–1 in MEAC play to win the MEAC regular season championship. They were also champions of the MEAC tournament to earn an automatic bid to the NCAA tournament, their first NCAA bid in school history, where they lost in the second round to Iowa State.

Roster

Schedule

|-
!colspan=9 style="background:#800000; color:#C0C0C0;"| Regular season

|-
!colspan=9 style="background:#800000; color:#C0C0C0;"| MEAC tournament

|-
!colspan=9 style="background:#800000; color:#C0C0C0;"| NCAA tournament

* Due to inclement weather in the Northeast, the January 4 game vs. Wagner was canceled.

References

North Carolina Central Eagles men's basketball seasons
North Carolina Central
North Carolina Central
North Carolina Central Eagles men's basketball team
North Carolina Central Eagles men's basketball team